Stephen Cosgrove may refer to:

 Stephen Cosgrove (footballer) (born 1980), Scottish footballer
 Stephen Cosgrove (writer) (born 1945), American children's author and toy designer